Sir Adrian Bruce Fulford  (born 8 January 1953) is a retired Lord Justice of Appeal. From 2017 to 2019, he was the first Investigatory Powers Commissioner, and was the Vice-President of the Court of Appeal (Criminal Division) in 2019, succeeding Lady Justice Hallett.

Previously, he was a judge of the International Criminal Court in The Hague from 2003–12, the Senior Presiding Judge for England and Wales from January 2016 to March 2017, and former member of the National Council for Civil Liberties (NCCL).

Early life
Fulford was born on 8 January 1953. He was educated at Elizabeth College, Guernsey and went up to the University of Southampton, gaining a LLB. From 1974 to 1975, he served as a housing advisor at Shelter's Housing Aid Service.

Legal career
He was called to the bar at the Middle Temple as a barrister in 1978, and appointed Queen's Counsel in 1994.

One of Fulford’s earliest, and most prominent cases was serving as barrister to Mr Ronnie Bolden, on trial at the Old Bailey in 1989 charged with armed robbery by the West Midlands Serious Crime Squad (SCS), which was later disbanded.

Judicial career
In 1995, Fulford was made a Recorder of the Crown Court (re-appointed in 2001). His appointment as a High Court judge on 21 November 2002 was the first such appointment of an openly homosexual QC.

High Court 
He was appointed to the Queen's Bench Division and received the customary knighthood. Though he became a judge of the International Criminal Court in 2003, Fulford continued his work at the High Court, presiding over a number of high-profile cases. Among these were the 21 July 2005 London bombings trial, an extremist Muslim plot to cause deadly explosions similar to those which killed over 50 people on 7 July;  the trial of terrorist plotter Saajid Badat; and the trial of PC Simon Harwood for the death of a street newspaper seller Iam Tomlinson in the City of London. Fulford's term on the ICC ended on 11 March 2012.

On 11 May 2012, Fulford imposed a whole life order on David Oakes, who was convicted at the Crown Court at Chelmsford of the premeditated and sadistic murder of his former partner and daughter. Fulford also presided over the trial of Jiervon Barlett and Najed Hoque who were accused of the manslaughter of Paula Castle, a woman mugged in Greenford, West London. He sentenced them to 13 years.

Fulford received the UK Government's nomination, and was subsequently elected in 2003 to serve, as one of 18 judges of the International Criminal Court for a term of nine years, and was assigned to the Trial Division. He was sworn into office on 11 March 2003. Fulford presided over the ICC's first trial, that of Thomas Lubanga, and in that capacity delivered the court's first guilty verdict on 14 March 2012.

Court of Appeal 
On 10 May 2013, Fulford was appointed a Lord Justice of Appeal.

In March 2014, the Mail on Sunday printed allegations that Fulford had been a supporter of the Pedophile Information Exchange (PIE) in the 1970s. Following this allegation, he stepped down from judging criminal cases and an official investigation by the Judicial Conduct Investigations Office took place. The investigation, by Lord Kerr of Tonaghmore, concluded on 18 June 2014 that the allegations against Fulford were "without substance" and he "was not and had never been a supporter of PIE or its aims". Following his exoneration, Fulford resumed sitting as a judge on the full range of appeals.

Fulford was appointed as the Deputy Senior Presiding Judge on 1 January 2015, and was promoted to Senior Presiding Judge on 1 January 2016 succeeding Peter Gross. On 31 March 2017, Fulford stood down from this position, to accept appointment as the first Investigatory Powers Commissioner in which role he will be supported by fifteen senior judges appointed under the Investigatory Powers Act 2016.

In 2021, he presided over the sentencing of Metropolitan Police officer Wayne Couzens, who pleaded guilty to the murder of Sarah Everard. Sentencing him at the Old Bailey to a whole-life tariff, Fulford described the case as "devastating, tragic and wholly brutal" and told Couzens he had eroded public confidence in the police.

On 1 October 2022, Fulford retired as a Lord Justice of Appeal.

Honours
 He was appointed as a Queen's Counsel (QC) in 1994.
 He was Knighted as a Knight Bachelor on 16 December 2002. The award was Gazetted on 11 March 2003.
 He was sworn in as a member of Her Majesty's Most Honourable Privy Council in 2013. This allows him the Honorific Title "The Right Honourable" for Life.
 He was awarded the Honorary Degree of Doctor of Laws (LLD) by the University of Southampton in 2011.

See also
Murder of Sarah Everard

References

1953 births
Living people
Alumni of the University of Southampton
English King's Counsel
21st-century English judges
20th-century English judges
International Criminal Court judges
Knights Bachelor
LGBT judges
English LGBT people
Gay men
Lords Justices of Appeal
Members of the Middle Temple
Members of the Privy Council of the United Kingdom
People educated at Elizabeth College, Guernsey
Queen's Bench Division judges
20th-century King's Counsel
British judges of international courts and tribunals
21st-century LGBT people